Lamanzer Deshan Williams (born November 17, 1974) is a former American football defensive end. He played briefly for the Jacksonville Jaguars in 1998. Williams played college football at Minnesota.

References 

1974 births
Living people
American football defensive ends
Minnesota Golden Gophers football players
People from Greensboro, Alabama
Jacksonville Jaguars players
Berlin Thunder players

People from Ypsilanti, Michigan
Sportspeople from Ypsilanti, Michigan